ICC Americas is an international body which oversees cricket in countries in the Americas. It is a subordinate body to the International Cricket Council (ICC). The organisation currently has 17 members, located in Northern America, Central America, South America, and the Caribbean, and is responsible for the development, promotion and administration of the game in the above regions.

ICC Americas oversees the regional qualification tournaments for the Cricket World Cup, the Women's Cricket World Cup, the ICC Men's T20 World Cup, the ICC Women's T20 World Cup, and the Under-19 Cricket World Cup. Previously it ran the ICC Americas Championship as the premier international competition in the region. The World Cup itself has only been held in the region on a single occasion, when the 2007 World Cup was hosted by the West Indies. Other subregional tournaments are organised between ICC members in the Americas, such as the Central American Cricket Championship and the South American Cricket Championship, but they are not organised by ICC Americas.

Previously the regional office was located in Toronto, but it was relocated to Colorado Springs, Colorado in 2016.

List of members

Full members

Associate Members with ODI and T20I status

Associate members with T20I status

Former Members

Cuba, which had its ICC membership revoked in 2012, was invited to participate in the 2010 ICC Americas Championship Division Four, but withdrew due to travel restrictions. It is unclear if Cuba remains a formal member of ICC Americas.

Related organisations

The short-lived Cricket Council of the Americas (CCAM) was formed in April 2001, after delegates from fifteen countries met in Antigua. The organisation was patterned after the three existing regional cricket councils at the time, and it was noted that one of its primary reasons for existence was "to deliver more effectively and efficiently the ICC development programme". It was stated that, as a result of the council's establishment, "the region [would] now be responsible for the strategy and the delivery of its own development programmes, as well as tournament management and funding arrangements".

The council had fifteen members at its peak, listed below. The inaugural meeting was also attended by delegates from two other countries, Guadeloupe and Mexico, but those countries were not given membership.

Representative teams

Senior men's team

In June 2015, it was announced that a combined team from the Americas development region would participate in the 2015–16 season of the Regional Super50, the West Indian domestic limited-overs competition. To select the squad for the tournament, an open combine was held in September 2015 at the Indianapolis World Sports Park, divided into two sections. The first part of the combine featured 83 invitees from five countries, although the vast majority (65, or 78 percent) were from the United States. Another 21 players were fast-tracked to the second part of the combine, where they were eventually joined by 12 of the first-section participants. The final squad featured nine Americans and six Canadians, with no other countries represented.

Senior women's team

Following the 2007 Women's Americas Championship in King City, Ontario, an Americas Select XI was selected from the three participating teams (Argentina, Bermuda, and Canada). Captained by Ave Mogan, a Canadian, the team played a one-off match against the Trinidad and Tobago national women's under-17 side, which it lost by five wickets.

The exercise was repeated after the 2009 Americas Championship in Fort Lauderdale, Florida, which featured two new teams (Brazil and the United States). With U.S. player Roselyn Emmanuel serving as captain, the team's opponent was a Trinidad and Tobago development XI, which went on to win by 29 runs in a rain-interrupted match at Central Broward Regional Park.

Age-group teams
At the 2000 Under-19 World Cup in Sri Lanka, the Americas development region was represented by a combined team, captained by future Canadian international Ashish Bagai. The team failed to win a single match (a fate it shared with Namibia), with its closest game being a seven-run loss to the Netherlands. Four countries were represented in the 14-man squad, which featured three Americans, three Argentines, four Bermudians, and four Canadians. All matches at the World Cup held under-19 One Day International (ODI) status.

A combined Americas under-19 team also played at the 2002, 2003, and 2004 editions of the West Indies Cricket Board's under-19 tournament. The 2002 event featured both three-day and one-day tournaments, with the latter played as a knock-out cup. However, the team, which featured Caymanian players for the first time, did not win a match in either format. That performance was repeated at both the 2003 and 2004 events.

In 2012, it was announced that the Americas development region would field a combined team in the WICB regional under-19 tournament, although it would have the age restriction loosened by one year compared to the other teams. The 2012 tournament was interrupted by rain, but the Americas under-20s side lost all three of its six matches where a result was possible. The team won its first ever match the following year, defeating the Leeward Islands by three wickets, but were once again winless at the 2014 event, and were not invited back in 2015.

See also

History of the West Indian cricket team
List of International Cricket Council members
West Indies women's cricket team
Cricket in Argentina

Notes

References

External links

Cricket administration

Pan-American sports governing bodies
Cricket in the Americas